Glenn Schuurman (born 16 April 1991) is a Dutch field hockey player who plays as a defender for Hoofdklasse club Bloemendaal. He played a total 159 matches from 2012 until 2021 for the Dutch national team and scored three goals.

He participated at the 2016 Summer Olympics.

Club career
He was born in Boxtel in the Netherlands, where he started playing hockey for the local hockey club MEP. In 2009 he transferred to Bloemendaal where he won the Dutch national title in 2010. In the 2018–19 season, he won his second national title with Bloemendaal by defeating Kampong in the championship final.

International career
Schuurman made his debut for the Dutch national team in 2012 in a friendly match against England. The following tournament, the 2012 Champions Trophy, they finished second and he won his first medal with the national team. At the 2018 Champions Trophy in Breda he played his 100th match for the Dutch national team.In June 2019, he was selected in the Netherlands squad for the 2019 EuroHockey Championship. They won the bronze medal by defeating Germany 4–0. After the 2020 Summer Olympics, he announced his retirement from international hockey.

References

External links

1991 births
Living people
People from Boxtel
Sportspeople from North Brabant
Dutch male field hockey players
Male field hockey defenders
Field hockey players at the 2016 Summer Olympics
2018 Men's Hockey World Cup players
Field hockey players at the 2020 Summer Olympics
Olympic field hockey players of the Netherlands
HC Bloemendaal players
Men's Hoofdklasse Hockey players